James Avery (1945–2013) was an American actor.

James Avery may also refer to:
 James Avery (American colonist) (1620–1700), Connecticut colonist, legislator, and military commander
 James Avery (baseball) (born 1984) Canadian baseball player
 James Avery (Medal of Honor) (1825–1898), American Civil War sailor and Medal of Honor recipient
 James Avery (musician) (1937–2009), American and German pianist and conductor
 James Avery, American jeweler and founder of the company James Avery Artisan Jewelry
 Jim Avery (born 1944), American football player
 James Avery (pilot boat),19th century Sandy Hook pilot boat